Francesco Rier, also known as Franco Rier (born December 2, 1908 in Rovereto; died in 1991) was an Italian professional football player.

Honours
 Serie A champion: 1930/31.

1908 births
1991 deaths
Italian footballers
Serie A players
S.S. Lazio players
Juventus F.C. players
Italian expatriate footballers
Expatriate footballers in Switzerland
Servette FC players
Expatriate footballers in France
Italian expatriate sportspeople in France
Italian expatriate sportspeople in Switzerland
Ligue 1 players
OGC Nice players
Brescia Calcio players
Palermo F.C. players
Association football midfielders